Ladies Doctor   is a 1996 Indian Telugu-language comedy film, produced by B. Vanaja and C. Kalyan under the Sri Ammulya Art Productions banner and directed by Ramu. It stars Rajendra Prasad, Vineetha, Keerthana  and music composed by Vidyasagar. The film was recorded as a flop at the box office.

Plot
Ram Prasad (Rajendra Prasad) a doctor without practice, falls for a beautiful girl Rani (Keerthana) and they decide to couple up. Parallelly, Janaki (Vineetha) an orthodox woman who follows yesteryear customs & traditions and holds a headstrong rule that no male should touch her except her fiancé. Once she suffers from severe appendicitis, due to the absence of a lady doctor, Ram Prasad performs the operation in a woman disguise. Later, Janaki learns the truth when she declares Ram Prasad as her husband. Here, Ramadasu (K. Ashok Kumar), Janaki's brother a hardcore criminal forcibly makes Ram Prasad propose his sister. At Present, Ram Prasad stuck between both. The rest of the story is a comic tale that how Ram Prasad discards from these problems and whom he is going to marry?

Cast

Rajendra Prasad as Dr. Ram Prasad
Vineetha as Janaki
Keerthana as Rani
Brahmanandam as Compounder
Babu Mohan as Pashanna Swamy
A.V.S as Rani's father
Costume Krishna as Ghoshanna Swamy
Rallapalli as Janaki's father
K.Ashok Kumar as Ramadasu
Vallabhaneni Janardhan as 30-60-Patta-Katti
M. S. Narayana as Drunkard
Kallu Chidambaram as a Marriage broker
Jagga Rao as House owner
Ramya Krishna as Ramya (Special appearance)
Rajitha as Nurse
Poojitha
Athili Lakshmi as Janaki's mother
Ratna Sagar as Janaki's grandmother
Y. Vijaya as Rani's mother

Soundtrack

Music composed by Vidyasagar. Music released on VE Audio Company.

References

External links

Films scored by Vidyasagar
1990s Telugu-language films
Films shot in Hyderabad, India